Tatsutagawa may refer to:

Tatsutagawa stable, a defunct stable of sumo wrestlers
Hōmashō Noriyuki, sumo wrestler and holder of the elder name Tatsutagawa
Tatsutagawa Station, a railway station in Heguri, Nara, Japan